Paul Androuet du Cerceau (1623–1710), was a French goldsmith and engraver, who was active in Paris around 1610. According to Benezit, Reynaud presumes he is the son of the architect Jean Baptiste Androuet du Cerceau, who built the Pont Neuf in Paris, but Paul is now believed to be the grandson of Jacques II Androuet du Cerceau.

See also
 Androuet du Cerceau for the family

References
Notes

Sources
 Benezit Dictionary of Artists (2006). "Ducerceau, Paul Androuet", vol. 4, p. 1241. Paris: Gründ. .
 Miller, Naomi (1996). "Du Cerceau. French family of artists.", vol. 9, pp. 350–354, in The Dictionary of Art, edited by Jane Turner, reprinted with minor corrections in 1998. .

French goldsmiths
Engravers from Paris
1623 births
1710 deaths
Metalsmiths from Paris